Par-T-One is an Italian electronic music group led by Sergio Casu aka Sergione and Andrea Pareo. They have also been sought after as re-mixers and house music DJs. According to the press, Sergio was in the Italian army before he became a DJ.

They released the single, "I'm So Crazy", based on "Just Keep Walking" by INXS and sampling "Like an Eagle" by Dennis Parker (aka Wade Nichols). The song reached number 19 on the UK Singles Chart, and top ten in Scotland. The video (directed by Sam Brown and Paul Gore, who have had later success by directing videos for James Blunt and The Bravery) won and has been nominated for various awards in the short film category and best promo video.

In 2021, they collaborated with Salmo on the song "Fuori di testa" from his 2021 album Flop.

Discography

Singles

Remixes 
La La Land - Green Velvet
I Want You Back - X-Press 2
Bring It On  -Playgroup (including dub)
Call Me - Dino
Doo Uap, Doo Uap, Doo Uap - Gabin
I Can't Say What I Am - Margot
O Superman - Silverspin
We've Got The Time - Jupiter Age
Challenge Destiny - Rollerblade
 Chase the Sun - Planet Funk

References

Websites 

DJ Pareo's Website

Italian electronic music groups